Defne Joy Foster (September 2, 1975February 2, 2011) was an American-Turkish actress, presenter and VJ.

Biography
Defne Joy Foster was born in İncirlik, Turkey. She was born to her Turkish mother Hatice from İzmir, Turkey and American father Steve. Defne (occasionally rendered as "Daphne" or "Daphné" in some sources) did her studies in Alsancak primary school and at İzmir Özel Fatih Lisesi, a private school, also in İzmir. Foster married Yasin Solmaz in 2008 and gave birth to only child of couple, male, Can Kılıç in 2009.

Death
Foster was found dead at her friend Kerem Altan's apartment in Istanbul on February 2, 2011. She was thought to have died from respiratory difficulty and a heart attack. The results of her autopsy was cardiac arrest caused by asthma and consumption of alcoholic drinks with medication. In February 2015, Kerem Altan was sentenced to two months in prison for waiting over two and a half hours after Foster fell unconscious before calling emergency services, however his sentence was suspended shortly after. Altan's statements were also contradictory to the forensic investigation. According to the investigators there was a total of four people in the house on the night of Foster's death, while Altan stated he and Foster were the only people home. Furthermore, according to Altan's testimony he did not have a sexual act with Foster during the night yet Foster's bottom underwear were found near the bed.

In 2016, further investigation into her death revealed that Kerem Altan was the only person whose testimony was taken by the police despite the taxi driver who brought the two home and the neighbor saying they had heard fighting and screams. A Ahmet Altan has been arrested in 2016 and the case has been reopened into the death of Foster, while a travel ban is placed on Kerem to prevent him from fleeing the country.

Career
Foster first appeared on TV screens as a VJ on Kral TV and later went into acting on various TV series. She last participated in Yok Böyle Dans, the Turkish version of Dancing with the Stars, where she finished 4th, having been eliminated in January 2011.

Television

References

External links 

 
 Defne Joy Foster at the SinemaTürk

1975 births
2011 deaths
Turkish game show hosts
Turkish women television presenters
Turkish television actresses
Turkish people of African-American descent
People from Adana
People from İzmir
American people of Turkish descent
Respiratory disease deaths in Turkey
Deaths from respiratory failure
Burials at Zincirlikuyu Cemetery
African-American actresses
20th-century African-American people
21st-century African-American people
20th-century African-American women
21st-century African-American women